Daniel T. Jones (born July 22, 1970) is a former American football offensive tackle who played for the Cincinnati Bengals of the National Football League (NFL). He played college football at University of Maine.

References 

1970 births
Living people
People from Malden, Massachusetts
Players of American football from Massachusetts
American football offensive tackles
Maine Black Bears football players
Cincinnati Bengals players